Sikun may refer to:

 Sikun, Iran, a village in Ilam Province, Iran
 Sikun (Dune), a fictional planet in the Dune universe created by Frank Herbert